This is a list of OHA standings and season-by-season summaries of the Ontario Hockey Association's Junior A division from 1933 to 1972, and its Tier I division from 1972 to 1974.

Legend
 GP = games played
 W = wins
 L = losses
 T = ties
 Pts = points
 GF = goals for
 GA = goals against

1933–34
The Toronto St. Michael's Majors won the J. Ross Robertson Cup, defeating the Stratford Midgets 2 games to 0.

Playoffs
Group Semi-finals
London beat Woodstock 3 goals to 2.
(1-2, 2-0)
Kitchener Empires beat Galt Terrier Pups 5 goals to 4.
(1-3, 4-1)

Group Finals
Toronto Young Rangers beat Parkdale Canoe Club 13 goals to 3.
(4-2, 9-1)
Toronto St. Michael's Majors beat Oshawa Majors 2 wins to none, 1 tie.
(3-3, 8-2, 10-4)
Windsor Wanderers beat London 8 goals to 5.
(2-0, 6-5)
Stratford Midgets beat Kitchener Empires 11 goals to 9.
(5-4, 6-5)

Semi-final
Stratford Midgets beat Windsor Wanderers 25 goals to 3.
(6-2, 19-1)
Toronto St. Michael's Majors beat Toronto Young Rangers 13 goals to 3.
(6-0, 7-3)

Robertson Cup Finals
Toronto St. Michael's Majors beat Stratford Midgets 2 wins to none.
(7-0, 4-2)

OHA Grand Championship
Toronto St. Michael's Majors beat St. Michael's Buzzers (Jr. B) by default.
(12-3, default)

1934–35
The Kitchener Greenshirts won the J. Ross Robertson Cup by default over the Oshawa Majors.

Playoffs
Group Semi-finals
Toronto Lions beat Toronto St. Michael's Majors 8 goals to 7.
(0-3, 5-2, 3-2)
Stratford Midgets beat Galt Terrier Pups 11 goals to 2.
(6-1, 5-1)

Group Finals
Oshawa Majors beat Toronto Lions 2 wins to none.
(10-2, 10-3)
Toronto Young Rangers beat Parkdale Canoe Club 13 goals to 4.
(4-3, 9-1)
Kitchener Greenshirts beat Stratford Midgets 2 wins to none, 1 tie.
(2-2, 6-1, 5-4)

Semi-final
Kitchener Greenshirts beat Windsor Wanderers 10 goals to 4.
(4-1, 6-3)
Oshawa Majors beat Toronto Young Rangers 10 goals to 8.
(3-4, 4-3, 3-1)

Robertson Cup Final
Results thrown out due to Oshawa using illegal player.
Oshawa won Game 1 4-1, Kitchener won Game 2 4-3, then it was discovered that Oshawa used an illegal player (Bill Bagnall).  Due to time constraints a third game was then played to determine entry into the Memorial Cup playdowns, but not the winner of the winner of the Robertson Cup -- to be determined later.

Robertson Cup replay
Quarter-final
Toronto Lions 9 - Toronto Young Rangers 8 (OT)

Semi-final
Kitchener Greenshirts 7 - Toronto Lions 5

Final
Kitchener Greenshirts beat Oshawa Majors by default
Oshawa refused to play, claiming they had already won the championship.  The Ontario Hockey Association disagreed and awarded the title to Kitchener.

1935–36
The West Toronto Nationals won the J. Ross Robertson Cup, defeating the Kitchener Greenshirts 2 games to 0.

Playoffs
Group Semi-finals
Toronto St. Michael's Majors beat Toronto Native Sons 9 goals to 6.
(3-4, 6-2)
West Toronto Nationals beat Toronto Young Rangers 6 goals to 3.
(5-0, 1-3)
Stratford Midgets beat Niagara Falls 12 goals to 9.
(6-5, 6-4)

Group Finals
West Toronto Nationals beat Toronto St. Michael's Majors 3 wins to none.
(1-0, 6-1, 6-5)
Kitchener Greenshirts beat Stratford Midgets 5 goals to 1.
(2-0, 3-1)

Semi-final
West Toronto Nationals beat Oshawa Majors 2 wins to none.
(5-2, 6-2)

Robertson Cup Final
West Toronto Nationals beat Kitchener Greenshirts 2 wins to none.
(3-2, 6-1)

1936–37
The Toronto St. Michael's Majors won the J. Ross Robertson Cup, defeating the Stratford Midgets 3 games to 2.

Playoffs
Group Semi-finals
Toronto St. Michael's Majors beat Toronto Young Rangers 2 wins to 1.
(7-4, 3-4, 12-4)
Toronto British Consols beat Oshawa Generals 2 wins to none.
(4-1, 5-5, 7-4)

Group Finals
Toronto St. Michael's Majors beat Toronto British Consols 3 wins to none.
(4-3, 5-3, 3-1)
Stratford Midgets beat Kitchener Greenshirts 2 wins to none.
(5-3, 4-1)

Robertson Cup
Toronto St. Michael's Majors beat Stratford Midgets 3 wins to 2.
(6-2, 4-7, 4-5, 6-5, 8-3)

1937–38
The Oshawa Generals won the J. Ross Robertson Cup, defeating the Guelph Indians 3 games to 0.

1938–39
The Oshawa Generals won the J. Ross Robertson Cup, defeating the Toronto Native Sons 3 games to 0.

1939–40
The league drops its divisions. The Toronto St. Michael's Majors and the Toronto Lions drop out of the league. The University of Toronto Varsity Blues drop out of the league mid-season. The Oshawa Generals won the J. Ross Robertson Cup, defeating the Toronto Marlboros 3 games to 2.

1940–41
Toronto Young Rangers are renamed Toronto Bowles Rangers. Guelph Indians become Guelph Biltmore Mad Hatters. The Oshawa Generals won the J. Ross Robertson Cup, defeating the Toronto Marlboros 4 games to 3.

1941–42
The Toronto Bowles Rangers revert to being the Toronto Young Rangers. The Toronto St. Michael's Majors rejoin the league. The Brantford Lions join the league. The Toronto Native Sons drop out halfway through the season, and declare all their games forfeit. The Oshawa Generals won the J. Ross Robertson Cup, defeating the Guelph Biltmore Mad Hatters 3 games to 2.

1942–43
The Hamilton Whizzers and the Stratford Kroehlers join the league. The Guelph Biltmore Mad Hatters drop out of the league. The Toronto Young Rangers drop out of the league. The Oshawa Generals won the J. Ross Robertson Cup, defeating the Brantford Lions 4 games to 1.

1943–44
The OHA splits into two groups when four teams join the league; the Galt Canadians, St. Catharines Falcons, Port Colborne Recreationists, and Toronto Young Rangers. The Hamilton Whizzers, become Hamilton Majors.  The Oshawa Generals won the J. Ross Robertson Cup, defeating the Toronto St. Michael's Majors 4 games to 1.

1944–45
The OHA groups are dissolved when the Brantford Lions, Stratford Kroehlers and Hamilton Majors drop out of league. The Galt Canadians become the Galt Red Wings.  The Port Colborne Recreationists drop out of the league mid-season. The inaugural Red Tilson Trophy is awarded to Doug McMurdy, as the most outstanding player in the OHA. The Toronto St. Michael's Majors won the J. Ross Robertson Cup, defeating the Galt Red Wings 4 games to 0.

(*) folded mid-season

1945–46
The Barrie Flyers and the Hamilton Lloyds join the league. The inaugural Eddie Powers Memorial Trophy is awarded for the top scorer in the league to Tod Sloan. He was also awarded the Red Tilson Trophy as the most outstanding player. The Toronto St. Michael's Majors won the J. Ross Robertson Cup, defeating the Oshawa Generals 4 games to 2.

1946–47
The Hamilton Lloyds become Hamilton Szabos. The Windsor Spitfires join the league, and the Stratford Kroehlers rejoin the league. The Toronto St. Michael's Majors won the J. Ross Robertson Cup, defeating the Galt Red Wings 4 games to 0.

Awards
 Red Tilson Trophy (Most outstanding player) = Ed Sandford, Toronto St. Michael's Majors
 Eddie Powers Memorial Trophy (Top scorer) = Fleming Mackell, Toronto St. Michael's Majors

1947–48
Hamilton drops out of the league. The Guelph Biltmore Mad Hatters join the league. The Galt Red Wings become the Galt Rockets. The St. Catharines Falcons become the St. Catharines Teepees. The Barrie Flyers won the J. Ross Robertson Cup, defeating the Windsor Spitfires 4 games to 2.

Awards
 Red Tilson Trophy (Most outstanding player) = George Armstrong, Stratford Kroehlers
 Eddie Powers Memorial Trophy (Top scorer) = George Armstrong, Stratford Kroehlers

1948–49
Toronto Young Rangers drop out of the league. The Barrie Flyers won the J. Ross Robertson Cup.

Awards
 Red Tilson Trophy (Most outstanding player) = Gil Mayer, Barrie Flyers
 Eddie Powers Memorial Trophy (Top scorer) = Bert Giesebrecht, Windsor Spitfires
 Dave Pinkney Trophy (Goaltenders of team with lowest GAA) = Gil Mayer, Barrie Flyers

1949–50
The Galt Rockets become the Galt Black Hawks. The Guelph Biltmore Mad Hatters won the J. Ross Robertson Cup.

Awards
 Red Tilson Trophy (Most outstanding player) = George Armstrong, Toronto Marlboros
 Eddie Powers Memorial Trophy (Top scorer) = Earl Reibel, Windsor Spitfires
 Dave Pinkney Trophy (Goaltenders of team with lowest GAA) = Don Lockhart, Toronto Marlboros

1950–51
The Waterloo Hurricanes join the league. The Barrie Flyers won the J. Ross Robertson Cup.

Awards
 Red Tilson Trophy (Most outstanding player) = Glenn Hall, Windsor Spitfires
 Eddie Powers Memorial Trophy (Top scorer) = Lou Jankowski, Oshawa Generals
 Dave Pinkney Trophy (Goaltenders of team with lowest GAA) = Don Lockhart, Toronto Marlboros & Lorne Howes, Barrie Flyers

All Stars
 G: Glenn Hall, Windsor Spitfires
 D: Jim Morrison, Guelph Biltmore Mad Hatters
 D: Frank Martin, St. Catharines Teepees
 C: Alex Delvecchio, Oshawa Generals, and Ken Laufman, Guelph Biltmore Mad Hatters (tied)
 R: Lou Jankowski, Oshawa Generals
 L: Real Chevrefils, Barrie Flyers

1951–52
The Kitchener Greenshirts join the league.  The Stratford Kroehlers drop out of the league. The Guelph Biltmore Mad Hatters won the J. Ross Robertson Cup.

Awards
 Red Tilson Trophy (Most outstanding player) = Bill Harrington, Kitchener Greenshirts
 Eddie Powers Memorial Trophy (Top scorer) = Ken Laufman, Guelph Biltmore Mad Hatters
 Dave Pinkney Trophy (Goaltenders of team with lowest GAA) = Don Head, Toronto Marlboros

1952–53
The Waterloo Hurricanes drop out of the league. The Barrie Flyers won the J. Ross Robertson Cup.

Awards
 Red Tilson Trophy (Most outstanding player) = Bob Attersley, Oshawa Generals
 Eddie Powers Memorial Trophy (Top scorer) = Jim McBurney, Galt Black Hawks
 Dave Pinkney Trophy (Goaltenders of team with lowest GAA) = John Henderson, Toronto Marlboros

1953–54
The Windsor Spitfires become the Hamilton Tiger Cubs. The Oshawa Generals drop out of the league, after a fire destroys the Hambly Arena. The St. Catharines Teepees won the J. Ross Robertson Cup.

Awards
 Red Tilson Trophy (Most outstanding player) = Brian Cullen, St. Catharines Teepees
 Eddie Powers Memorial Trophy (Top scorer) = Brian Cullen, St. Catharines Teepees
 Dave Pinkney Trophy (Goaltenders of team with lowest GAA) = Dennis Riggin, Hamilton Tiger Cubs

1954–55
The Kitchener Greenshirts become the Kitchener Canucks. The Toronto Marlboros won the J. Ross Robertson Cup.

Awards
 Red Tilson Trophy (Most outstanding player) = Hank Ciesla, St. Catharines Teepees
 Eddie Powers Memorial Trophy (Top scorer) = Hank Ciesla, St. Catharines Teepees
 Dave Pinkney Trophy (Goaltenders of team with lowest GAA) = John Albani, Toronto Marlboros

 All Stars - First Team
 G: Dennis Riggin, Hamilton Tiger Cubs
 D: Ron Howell, Guelph Biltmore Mad Hatters
 D: Elmer Vasko, St. Catharines Teepees
 C: Hank Ciesla, St. Catharines Teepees
 R: Barry Cullen, St. Catharines Teepees
 L: Bill McCreary, Guelph Biltmore Mad Hatters

 All Stars - Second Team
 G: John Albani, Toronto Marlboros
 D: Larry Hillman, Hamilton Tiger Cubs
 D: unknown
 C: Billy Harris, Toronto Marlboros
 R: Gary Aldcorn, Toronto Marlboros
 L: Dick Duff, Toronto St. Michael's Majors

1955–56
The Galt Black Hawks drop out of the league. The Toronto Marlboros won the J. Ross Robertson Cup.

Awards
 Red Tilson Trophy (Most outstanding player) = Ron Howell, Guelph Biltmore Mad Hatters
 Eddie Powers Memorial Trophy (Top scorer) = Stan Baluik, Kitchener Canucks
 Dave Pinkney Trophy (Goaltenders of team with lowest GAA) = Jim Crocket, Toronto Marlboros

 All Stars - First Team
 G: Dennis Riggin, Hamilton Tiger Cubs
 D: Ron Howell, Guelph Biltmore Mad Hatters
 D: Elmer Vasko, St. Catharines Teepees
 C: Stan Baluik, Kitchener Canucks
 R: Walt Bradley, Kitchener Canucks
 L: Ab McDonald, St. Catharines Teepees

 All Stars - Second Team
 G: Roy Edwards, St. Catharines Teepees
 D: Al MacNeil, Toronto Marlboros
 D: Bob Baun, Toronto Marlboros
 C: Max Szturm, Hamilton Tiger Cubs
 R: Bob Forhan, Guelph Biltmore Mad Hatters
 L: Frank Mahovlich, Toronto St. Michael's Majors

1956–57
The Kitchener Canucks become the Peterborough TPT Petes. The Guelph Biltmore Mad Hatters won the J. Ross Robertson Cup.
Each team played each other team eight times, as well as playing four games against the Hull-Ottawa Canadiens.

Awards
 Red Tilson Trophy (Most outstanding player) = Frank Mahovlich, Toronto St. Michael's Majors
 Eddie Powers Memorial Trophy (Top scorer) = Bill Sweeney, Guelph Biltmore Mad Hatters
 Dave Pinkney Trophy (Goaltenders of team with lowest GAA) = Len Broderick, Toronto Marlboros

 All Stars - First Team
 G: Bruce Gamble, Guelph Biltmore Mad Hatters
 D: Ron Casey, Toronto Marlboros
 D: Harry Neale, Toronto Marlboros
 C: Frank Mahovlich, Toronto St. Michael's Majors
 R: Bob Nevin, Toronto Marlboros
 L: Eddie Shack, Guelph Biltmore Mad Hatters

 All Stars - Second Team
 G: Carl Wetzel, Hamilton Tiger Cubs
 D: John Chasczewski, Barrie Flyers
 D: unknown
 C: Bill Sweeney, Guelph Biltmore Mad Hatters, and Bill Kennedy, Toronto Marlboros
 R: unknown
 L: unknown

1957–58
Each team played each other team eight times, as well as playing four games against the Hull-Ottawa Canadiens (although the final game between Barrie and Hull-Ottawa was cancelled).
The Hamilton Spectator donated a trophy awarded annually to the team that finished first overall in the regular season. The St. Catharines Teepees won the first Hamilton Spectator Trophy. The Toronto Marlboros won the J. Ross Robertson Cup.

Awards
 Red Tilson Trophy (Most outstanding player) = Murray Oliver, Hamilton Tiger Cubs
 Eddie Powers Memorial Trophy (Top scorer) = John McKenzie, St. Catharines Teepees
 Dave Pinkney Trophy (Goaltenders of team with lowest GAA) = Len Broderick, Toronto Marlboros

 All Stars - First Team
 G: Bruce Gamble, Guelph Biltmore Mad Hatters
 D: Carl Brewer, Toronto Marlboros
 D: Wayne Hillman, St. Catharines Teepees
 C: Ed Hoekstra, St. Catharines Teepees
 R: John McKenzie, St. Catharines Teepees
 L: Jack McMaster, Toronto Marlboros

 All Stars - Second Team
 G: Carl Wetzel, Hamilton Tiger Cubs
 D: Irv Spencer, Peterborough TPT Petes
 D: Wally Chevrier, Guelph Biltmore Mad Hatters
 C: Murray Oliver, Hamilton Tiger Cubs
 R: Bob Nevin, Toronto Marlboros
 L: Stan Mikita, St. Catharines Teepees

1958–59
The St. Catharines Teepees repeated their first overall finish in the regular season, winning the Hamilton Spectator Trophy. The Peterborough TPT Petes won the J. Ross Robertson Cup.

Awards
 Red Tilson Trophy (Most outstanding player) = Stan Mikita, St. Catharines Teepees
 Eddie Powers Memorial Trophy (Top scorer) = Stan Mikita, St. Catharines Teepees
 Dave Pinkney Trophy (Goaltenders of team with lowest GAA) = Jacques Caron, Peterborough TPT Petes

 All Stars - First Team
 G: Denis DeJordy, St. Catharines Teepees
 D: Lloyd Haddon, Hamilton Tiger Cubs
 D: Pat Stapleton, St. Catharines Teepees
 C: Stan Mikita, St. Catharines Teepees
 R: Wayne Connelly, Peterborough TPT Petes
 L: Fred Hilts, St. Catharines Teepees

 All Stars - Second Team
 G: Norm Jacques, Barrie Flyers
 D: Wayne Hillman, St. Catharines Teepees
 D: Darryl Sly, Toronto St. Michael's Majors, and Roger Cote, Toronto Marlboros (tied)
 C: Larry Babcock, Peterborough TPT Petes, and Danny Patrick, Barrie Flyers (tied)
 R: Chico Maki, St. Catharines Teepees
 L: Bill Mahoney, Peterborough TPT Petes

1959–60
The Toronto Marlboros finished first overall in the regular season, winning the Hamilton Spectator Trophy. The St. Catharines Teepees won the J. Ross Robertson Cup.

Awards
 Red Tilson Trophy (Most outstanding player) = Wayne Connelly, Peterborough TPT Petes
 Eddie Powers Memorial Trophy (Top scorer) = Chico Maki, St. Catharines Teepees
 Dave Pinkney Trophy (Goaltenders of team with lowest GAA) = Gerry Cheevers, Toronto St. Michael's Majors

 All Stars
 G: Roger Crozier, St. Catharines Teepees
 D: Dale Rolfe, Barrie Flyers
 D: Pat Stapleton, St. Catharines Teepees
 C: Dave Keon, Toronto St. Michael's Majors
 R: Chico Maki, St. Catharines Teepees
 L: Pierre Gagne, Barrie Flyers, and Vic Hadfield, St. Catharines Teepees

1960–61
The Guelph Biltmore Mad Hatters become the Guelph Royals. The Barrie Flyers become the Niagara Falls Flyers. The Hamilton Tiger Cubs become the Hamilton Red Wings. The OHA inaugurates the Max Kaminsky Trophy for the league's most gentlemanly player. The Guelph Royals finished first overall in the regular season, winning the Hamilton Spectator Trophy. The Toronto St. Michael's Majors won the J. Ross Robertson Cup.

Awards
 Red Tilson Trophy (Most outstanding player) = Rod Gilbert, Guelph Biltmore Mad Hatters
 Eddie Powers Memorial Trophy (Top scorer) = Rod Gilbert, Guelph Biltmore Mad Hatters
 Dave Pinkney Trophy (Goaltenders of team with lowest GAA) = Bud Blom, Hamilton Red Wings
 Max Kaminsky Trophy (Most gentlemanly player) = Bruce Draper, Toronto St. Michael's Majors

 All Stars - First Team
 G: Roger Crozier, St. Catharines Teepees
 D: Ed Westfall, Niagara Falls Flyers
 D: Barclay Plager, Peterborough TPT Petes, and Al LeBrun, Guelph Biltmore Mad Hatters (tied)
 C: Bruce Draper, Toronto St. Michael's Majors
 R: Rod Gilbert, Guelph Biltmore Mad Hatters
 L: Gary Jarrett, Toronto Marlboros

 All Stars - Second Team
 G: Gerry Cheevers, Toronto St. Michael's Majors
 D: Mike McMahon, Guelph Biltmore Mad Hatters
 D: Terry O'Malley, Toronto St. Michael's Majors
 C: Jean Ratelle, Guelph Biltmore Mad Hatters
 R: Murray Hall, St. Catharines Teepees
 L: Bob Cunningham, Guelph Biltmore Mad Hatters

1961–62
The Montreal Jr. Canadiens join the OHA from the Quebec Junior Hockey League. The Metro Junior A League starts. Its teams will be the St. Michael's Majors, Toronto Marlboros, Brampton 7Ups, Unionville Seaforths and Whitby Mohawks. The Montreal Junior Canadiens finished first overall in the regular season, winning the Hamilton Spectator Trophy. The Hamilton Red Wings won the J. Ross Robertson Cup.

Awards
 Red Tilson Trophy (Most outstanding player) = Pit Martin, Hamilton Red Wings
 Eddie Powers Memorial Trophy (Top scorer) = Andre Boudrias, Montreal Junior Canadiens
 Dave Pinkney Trophy (Goaltenders of team with lowest GAA) = George Holmes, Montreal Junior Canadiens
 Max Kaminsky Trophy (Most gentlemanly player) = Lowell MacDonald, Hamilton Tiger Cubs

 All Stars - First Team
 G: Roger Crozier, St. Catharines Teepees
 D: Jacques Laperriere, Montreal Junior Canadiens
 D: Mike McMahon, Guelph Royals, and Ron Harris, Hamilton Red Wings
 C: Pit Martin, Hamilton Red Wings
 R: Lowell MacDonald, Hamilton Red Wings
 L: Rejean Richer, Montreal Junior Canadiens

 All Stars - Second Team
 G: Buddy Blom, Hamilton Red Wings
 D: Bob Wall, Hamilton Red Wings
 D: John Gravel, Montreal Junior Canadiens
 C: Phil Esposito, St. Catharines Teepees
 R: Andre Boudrias, Montreal Junior Canadiens
 L: Howie Dietrich, Niagara Falls Flyers

1962–63
The Oshawa Generals join the Metro Junior League. The Toronto St. Michael's Majors become the Toronto Neil McNeil Maroons. The Unionville Seaforths become Toronto Knob Hill Farms. The Whitby Mohawks become the Whitby Dunlops. The St. Catharines Teepees become the St. Catharines Black Hawks. The Niagara Falls Flyers finished first overall in the regular season, winning the Hamilton Spectator Trophy, and won the J. Ross Robertson Cup in the playoffs.

Awards
 Red Tilson Trophy (Most outstanding player) = Wayne Maxner, Niagara Falls Flyers
 Eddie Powers Memorial Trophy (Top scorer) = Wayne Maxner, Niagara Falls Flyers
 Dave Pinkney Trophy (Goaltenders of team with lowest GAA) = Chuck Goddard, Peterborough Petes
 Max Kaminsky Trophy (Most gentlemanly player) = Paul Henderson, Hamilton Red Wings

 All Stars - First Team
 G: Chuck Goddard, Peterborough Petes
 D: Bryan Watson, Peterborough Petes
 D: Bob Wall, Hamilton Red Wings
 C: Pit Martin, Hamilton Red Wings
 R: Paul Henderson, Hamilton Red Wings
 L: Wayne Maxner, Niagara Falls Flyers

 All Stars - Second Team
 G: George Gardner, Niagara Falls Flyers
 D: Poul Popiel, St. Catharines Black Hawks
 D: Ron Hergott and Don Awrey, Niagara Falls Flyers
 C: Billy Inglis, Montreal Junior Canadiens
 R: Yvan Cournoyer, Montreal Junior Canadiens
 L: Germain Gagnon, Montreal Junior Canadiens

1963–64
The Metro Junior League disbands. The Toronto Marlboros rejoin the OHA, as do the Oshawa Generals although they play their first season in Bowmanville.  The other teams in the Metro Junior League cease operations. The Guelph Royals become the Kitchener Rangers. The Toronto Marlboros, now the only team representing Toronto in an OHA Junior A season in the league's history, finished first overall in the regular season, winning the Hamilton Spectator Trophy, and won the J. Ross Robertson Cup in the playoffs.

Awards
 Red Tilson Trophy (Most outstanding player) = Yvan Cournoyer, Montreal Junior Canadiens
 Eddie Powers Memorial Trophy (Top scorer) = Andre Boudrias, Montreal Junior Canadiens
 Dave Pinkney Trophy (Goaltenders of team with lowest GAA) = Bernie Parent, Niagara Falls Flyers
 Max Kaminsky Trophy (Most gentlemanly player) = Fred Stanfield, St. Catharines Black Hawks

 All Stars - First Team
 G: Chuck Goddard, Peterborough Petes
 D: Bobby Orr, Oshawa  Generals
 D: Doug Jarrett, St. Catharines Black Hawks
 C: Andre Boudrias, Montreal Junior Canadiens
 R: Yvan Cournoyer, Montreal Junior Canadiens
 L: Dennis Hull, St. Catharines Black Hawks

 All Stars - Second Team
 G: Bernie Parent, Niagara Falls Flyers
 D: Rod Seiling, Toronto Marlboros
 D: Bob Jamieson, Peterborough Petes
 C: Ron Schock, Niagara Falls Flyers
 R: Ron Ellis, Toronto Marlboros
 L: Wayne Carleton, Toronto Marlboros

1964–65
The Niagara Falls Flyers finished first overall in the regular season, winning the Hamilton Spectator Trophy, and won the J. Ross Robertson Cup in the playoffs.

Awards
 Red Tilson Trophy (Most outstanding player) = Andre Lacroix, Peterborough Petes
 Eddie Powers Memorial Trophy (Top scorer) = Ken Hodge, St. Catharines Black Hawks
 Dave Pinkney Trophy (Goaltenders of team with lowest GAA) = Bernie Parent, Niagara Falls Flyers
 Max Kaminsky Trophy (Most gentlemanly player) = Jimmy Peters Jr., Hamilton Red Wings

 All Stars - First Team
 G: Bernie Parent, Niagara Falls Flyers
 D: Bobby Orr, Oshawa  Generals
 D: Jim McKenny, Toronto Marlboros, and Gilles Marotte, Niagara Falls Flyers (tied)
 C: Andre Lacroix, Peterborough Petes
 R: Ken Hodge, St. Catharines Black Hawks
 L: Brit Selby, Toronto Marlboros

 All Stars - Second Team
 G: Chuck Goddard, Peterborough Petes
 D: Serge Savard, Montreal Junior Canadiens
 D: John Vanderburg, Peterborough Petes
 C: Ron Buchanan, Oshawa Generals
 R: Danny Grant, Peterborough Petes
 L: Jacques Lemaire, Montreal Junior Canadiens

1965–66
The London Nationals are granted a franchise, moving their Junior B team of the same name to Ingersoll. The Peterborough Petes finished first overall in the regular season, winning the Hamilton Spectator Trophy. The Oshawa Generals won the J. Ross Robertson Cup.

Awards
 Red Tilson Trophy (Most outstanding player) = Andre Lacroix, Peterborough Petes
 Eddie Powers Memorial Trophy (Top scorer) = Andre Lacroix, Peterborough Petes
 Dave Pinkney Trophy (Goaltenders of team with lowest GAA) = Ted Ouimet, Montreal Junior Canadiens
 Max Kaminsky Trophy (Most gentlemanly player) = Andre Lacroix, Peterborough Petes

 All Stars - First Team
 G: Ian Young, Oshawa Generals
 D: Bobby Orr, Oshawa  Generals
 D: Jim McKenny, Toronto Marlboros
 C: Andre Lacroix, Peterborough Petes
 R: Mickey Redmond, Peterborough Petes
 L: Danny Grant, Peterborough Petes

 All Stars - Second Team
 G: Brian Caley, Peterborough Petes, Rocky Farr, London Knights, and Bobby Ring, Niagara Falls Flyers (tied)
 D: Bart Crashley, Hamilton Red Wings
 D: Serge Savard, Montreal Junior Canadiens
 C: Derek Sanderson, Niagara Falls Flyers
 R: Jean Pronovost, Niagara Falls Flyers
 L: Don Marcotte, Niagara Falls Flyers

1966–67
The Kitchener Rangers finished first overall in the regular season, winning the Hamilton Spectator Trophy. The Toronto Marlboros won the J. Ross Robertson Cup.

Awards
 Red Tilson Trophy (Most outstanding player) = Mickey Redmond, Peterborough Petes
 Eddie Powers Memorial Trophy (Top scorer) = Derek Sanderson, Niagara Falls Flyers
 Dave Pinkney Trophy (Goaltenders of team with lowest GAA) = Peter McDuffe, St. Catharines Black Hawks
 Max Kaminsky Trophy (Most gentlemanly player) = Mickey Redmond, Peterborough Petes

 All Stars - First Team
 G: Peter McDuffe, St. Catharines Black Hawks
 D: Brian Glennie, Toronto Marlboros
 D: Tom Reid, St. Catharines Black Hawks
 C: Derek Sanderson, Niagara Falls Flyers
 R: Mickey Redmond, Peterborough Petes
 L: Gerry Meehan, Toronto Marlboros

 All Stars - Second Team
 G: Ian Young, Oshawa Generals
 D: Mike Robitaille, Kitchener Rangers
 D: Rick Smith, Hamilton Red Wings
 C: Walt Tkaczuk, Kitchener Rangers
 R: Tim Ecclestone, Kitchener Rangers
 L: John Vanderburg, Peterborough Petes

1967–68
The Ottawa 67's are granted a franchise. The Kitchener Rangers finished first overall in the regular season, winning the Hamilton Spectator Trophy. The Niagara Falls Flyers won the J. Ross Robertson Cup.

Awards
 Red Tilson Trophy (Most outstanding player) = Walt Tkaczuk, Kitchener Rangers
 Eddie Powers Memorial Trophy (Top scorer) = Tom Webster, Niagara Falls Flyers
 Dave Pinkney Trophy (Goaltenders of team with lowest GAA) = Jim Rutherford & Gerry Gray, Hamilton Red Wings
 Max Kaminsky Trophy (Most gentlemanly player) = Tom Webster, Niagara Falls Flyers

 All Stars - First Team
 G: Gerry Gray, Hamilton Red Wings
 D: Mike Robitaille, Kitchener Rangers
 D: Rick Ley, Niagara Falls Flyers
 C: Walt Tkaczuk, Kitchener Rangers
 R: Danny Lawson, Hamilton Red Wings
 L: Jack Egers, Kitchener Rangers

 All Stars - Second Team
 G: Phil Myre, Niagara Falls Flyers
 D: Brad Park, Toronto Marlboros
 D: Rick Smith, Hamilton Red Wings
 C: Terry Caffery, Toronto Marlboros
 R: Tom Webster, Niagara Falls Flyers
 L: Richie Bayes, Toronto Marlboros

1968–69
The London Nationals become the London Knights. The Montreal Junior Canadiens finished first overall in the regular season, winning the Hamilton Spectator Trophy, and won the J. Ross Robertson Cup in the playoffs.

Awards
 Red Tilson Trophy (Most outstanding player) = Rejean Houle, Montreal Junior Canadiens
 Eddie Powers Memorial Trophy (Top scorer) = Rejean Houle, Montreal Junior Canadiens
 Dave Pinkney Trophy (Goaltenders of team with lowest GAA) = Wayne Wood & Ted Tucker, Montreal Junior Canadiens
 Max Kaminsky Trophy (Most gentlemanly player) = Rejean Houle, Montreal Junior Canadiens

All Stars - First Team
 G: Jim Rutherford, Hamilton Red Wings
 D: Dick Redmond, St. Catharines Black Hawks
 D: Randy Manery, Hamilton Red Wings
 C: Gilbert Perreault, Montreal Junior Canadiens
 R: Rejean Houle, Montreal Junior Canadiens
 L: Marc Tardif, Montreal Junior Canadiens

All Stars - Second Team
 G: Paul Hoganson, Toronto Marlboros
 D: Ron Stackhouse, Peterborough Petes
 D: Serge Lajeunesse, Montreal Junior Canadiens
 C: Darryl Sittler, London Knights
 R: Phil Roberto, Niagara Falls Flyers
 L: Don Tannahill, Niagara Falls Flyers

1969–70
The Max Kaminsky Trophy is rededicated, now awarded to the most outstanding defenceman in the league. The Montreal Junior Canadiens finished first overall in the regular season, winning the Hamilton Spectator Trophy, and won the J. Ross Robertson Cup in the playoffs.

Awards
 Red Tilson Trophy (Most outstanding player) = Gilbert Perreault, Montreal Junior Canadiens
 Eddie Powers Memorial Trophy (Top scorer) = Marcel Dionne, St. Catharines Black Hawks
 Dave Pinkney Trophy (Goaltenders of team with lowest GAA) = John Garrett, Peterborough Petes
 Max Kaminsky Trophy (Most outstanding defenceman) = Ron Plumb, Peterborough Petes

All Stars - First Team
 G: George Hulme, St. Catharines Black Hawks
 D: Ron Plumb, Peterborough Petes
 D: Bob Stewart, Oshawa Generals
 C: Gilbert Perreault, Montreal Junior Canadiens
 R: Al McDonough, St. Catharines Black Hawks
 L: Rick MacLeish, Peterborough Petes

All Stars - Second Team
 G: John Garrett, Peterborough Petes
 D: Steve Cuddie, Toronto Marlboros
 D: Jocelyn Guevremont and Serge Lajeunesse, Montreal Junior Canadiens (tied)
 C: Marcel Dionne, St. Catharines Black Hawks
 R: Buster Harvey, Hamilton Red Wings
 L: Robert Guindon, Montreal Junior Canadiens

1970–71
OHA president Tubby Schmalz was concerned with the level of physical play during the season, and personally interviewed four players to dissuade them from further on-ice misconduct. He submitted recommendations to the 1971 Canadian Amateur Hockey Association general meeting on behalf of the OHA to reduce the curvature of the hockey stick to one half inch for player safety. He also suggest to revert to the rectangular goal crease from the recent change to a semi-circle, since some rinks in his league were used by professional teams who used the old rules for the goal crease. Schmalz wanted to see consistency the application of the rules, and raise the standards for the level of instruction given to players. He instituted referee and coach clinics in the OHA, prior to it being mandated at the national level. In 1971, he sought to hire a technical director to conduct coaching and refereeing clinics across the province. 

Schmalz announced that teams from the OHA and the Quebec Major Junior Hockey League would not play against any team from the Western Canada Hockey League (WCHL) for the 1971 Memorial Cup, due to disagreements over travel allowances given to team at the Memorial Cup and the higher number of over-age players allowed on WCHL rosters. He said that plans for an Eastern Canada series for the George Richardson Memorial Trophy would go ahead. As of the OHA playoffs, he reiterated that teams were still unanimous in their decision not to play for the Memorial Cup against WCHL teams. The Peterborough Petes finished first overall in the regular season, winning the Hamilton Spectator Trophy. The St. Catharines Black Hawks won the J. Ross Robertson Cup. 

Awards
 Red Tilson Trophy (Most outstanding player) = Dave Gardner, Toronto Marlboros
 Eddie Powers Memorial Trophy (Top scorer) = Marcel Dionne, St. Catharines Black Hawks
 Dave Pinkney Trophy (Goaltenders of team with lowest GAA) = John Garrett, Peterborough Petes
 Max Kaminsky Trophy (Most outstanding defenceman) = Jocelyn Guevremont, Montreal Junior Canadiens

All Stars - First Team
 G: John Garrett, Peterborough Petes
 D: Denis Potvin, Ottawa 67's
 D: Jocelyn Guevremont, Montreal Junior Canadiens
 C: Marcel Dionne, St. Catharines Black Hawks
 R: Steve Vickers, Toronto Marlboros
 L: Rick Martin, Montreal Junior Canadiens

All Stars - Second Team
 G: Michel Larocque, Ottawa 67's
 D: Steve Durbano, Toronto Marlboros
 D: Rick Cunningham, Peterborough Petes
 C: Dave Gardner, Toronto Marlboros
 R: Bill Harris, Toronto Marlboros
 L: Steve Shutt, Toronto Marlboros

1971–72
Two new trophies are inaugurated for the 1971–72 season. The Matt Leyden Trophy is awarded for the Coach of the Year. The Jim Mahon Memorial Trophy is awarded for the top-scoring right winger. It was donated by the Peterborough Petes in memory of Jim Mahon, who died in the summer. The Toronto Marlboros finished first overall in the regular season, winning the Hamilton Spectator Trophy. The Peterborough Petes won the J. Ross Robertson Cup.

Awards
 Red Tilson Trophy (Most outstanding player) = Don Lever, Niagara Falls Flyers
 Eddie Powers Memorial Trophy (Top scorer) = Dave Gardner, Toronto Marlboros & Billy Harris, Toronto Marlboros
 Jim Mahon Memorial Trophy (Top-scoring right winger) = Billy Harris, Toronto Marlboros
 Dave Pinkney Trophy (Goaltenders of team with lowest GAA) = Michel Larocque, Ottawa 67's
 Max Kaminsky Trophy (Most outstanding defenceman) = Denis Potvin, Ottawa 67's
 Matt Leyden Trophy (Coach of the Year) = Gus Bodnar, Oshawa Generals

All Stars - First Team
 G: Michel Larocque, Ottawa 67's
 D: Denis Potvin, Ottawa 67's
 D: Paul Shakes, St. Catharines Black Hawks
 C: Don Lever, Niagara Falls Flyers
 R: Bill Harris, Toronto Marlboros
 L: Steve Shutt, Toronto Marlboros

All Stars - Second Team
 G: Gilles Gratton, Oshawa Generals
 D: Jim Schoenfeld, Niagara Falls Flyers
 D: Ian Turnbull, Montreal Junior Canadiens
 C: Dave Gardner, Toronto Marlboros
 R: Dennis Ververgaert, London Knights
 L: Randy Osburn, London Knights

1972–73
Junior A hockey is divided into "Tier I" and "Tier II." The OHA Junior A teams from 1972 became the Tier I division, also known as Major Junior hockey. The Montreal Junior Canadiens move to the QMJHL; the Niagara Falls Flyers move to Sudbury, becoming the Sudbury Wolves. The Sault Ste. Greyhounds are granted an expansion franchise. The Emms Family Award is donated to the OHA by Hap Emms, to be awarded to the Rookie of the Year. The Toronto Marlboros finished first overall in the regular season, winning the Hamilton Spectator Trophy, and won the J. Ross Robertson Cup in the playoffs.

Awards
 Red Tilson Trophy (Most outstanding player) = Rick Middleton, Oshawa Generals
 Eddie Powers Memorial Trophy (Top scorer) = Blake Dunlop, Ottawa 67's
 Jim Mahon Memorial Trophy (Top-scoring right winger) = Dennis Ververgaert, London Knights
 Dave Pinkney Trophy (Goaltenders of team with lowest GAA) = Mike Palmateer, Toronto Marlboros
 Max Kaminsky Trophy (Most outstanding defenceman) = Denis Potvin, Ottawa 67's
 Emms Family Award (Rookie of the Year) = Dennis Maruk, London Knights
 Matt Leyden Trophy (Coach of the Year) = George Armstrong, Toronto Marlboros

All Stars - First Team
 G: Mike Palmateer, Toronto Marlboros
 D: Denis Potvin, Ottawa 67's
 D: Bob Dailey, Toronto Marlboros
 C: Reg Thomas, London Knights
 R: Dennis Ververgaert, London Knights
 L: Morris Titanic, Sudbury Wolves

All Stars - Second Team
 G: Peter Crosbie, London Knights, & Rick St. Croix, Oshawa Generals
 D: Ian Turnbull, Ottawa 67's
 D: Bob Neely, Peterborough Petes
 C: Blake Dunlop, Ottawa 67's
 R: Rick Middleton, Oshawa Generals
 L: Bill Lochead, Oshawa Generals

1973–74
The Kingston Canadians are granted a franchise. The Kitchener Rangers finished first overall in the regular season, winning the Hamilton Spectator Trophy. The St. Catharines Black Hawks won the J. Ross Robertson Cup. The OHA became the OMJHL for the 1974–75 OMJHL season.

Awards
 Red Tilson Trophy (Most outstanding player) = Jack Valiquette, Sault Ste. Marie Greyhounds
 Eddie Powers Memorial Trophy (Top scorer) = Jack Valiquette, Sault Ste. Marie Greyhounds & Rick Adduono, St. Catharines Black Hawks
 Jim Mahon Memorial Trophy (Top-scoring right winger) = Dave Gorman, St. Catharines Black Hawks
 Dave Pinkney Trophy (Goaltenders of team with lowest GAA) = Don Edwards, Kitchener Rangers
 Max Kaminsky Trophy (Most outstanding defenceman) = Jim Turkiewicz, Peterborough Petes
 Emms Family Award (Rookie of the Year) = Jack Valiquette, Sault Ste. Marie Greyhounds
 Matt Leyden Trophy (Coach of the Year) = Jack Bownass, Kingston Canadians

All Stars - First Team
 G: Don Edwards, Kitchener Rangers
 D: Jim Turkiewicz, Peterborough Petes
 D: Rick Chartraw, Kitchener Rangers
 C: Jack Valiquette, Sault Ste. Marie Greyhounds
 R: Wilf Paiement, St. Catharines Black Hawks
 L: Bill Lochead, Oshawa Generals

All Stars - Second Team
 G: Mike Kasmetis, Peterborough Petes
 D: Dave Maloney, Kitchener Rangers
 D: Paul McIntosh, Peterborough Petes
 C: Bruce Boudreau, Toronto Marlboros
 R: Dave Gorman, St. Catharines Black Hawks
 L: Mike Marson, Sudbury Wolves

References

Bibliography

External links
 www.hockeydb.com
 www.sihrhockey.org

+OHA
Canadian ice hockey-related lists
Junior A standings
Ontario sport-related lists